Scissorfight is a four-piece American band from Portsmouth, New Hampshire.

Biography 
Scissorfight formed in 1995 in the town of Portsmouth. The original lineup consisted of guitarist Jay Fortin, bassist Paul Jarvis, and drummer Joel Muzzey. Blending extreme genres such as grindcore and post-hardcore, the band hired vocalist Ironlung (named for his ability to take in illegal substances) to "stand there and look scary".

They recorded their debut, 1996's Guaranteed Kill. The band followed it up with 1998's Balls Deep. They signed with independent label Tortuga Recordings to release 1999's New Hampshire. The band played at River Rave festival, where they performed with Cypress Hill and Stone Temple Pilots. They released an EP of covers entitled Piscataqua soon after, and were featured on MTV's "You Hear It First" segment. In 2001 the band released two albums, the original Mantrapping for Sport and Profit and an album of re-recorded songs to be released in Britain called American Cloven Hoof Blues. A series of EPs (Potential New Agent for Unconventional Warfare, Deathchants, Breakdowns and Military Waltzes, Vol. 2, and Victory over Horseshit) followed, with the full-length Jaggernaut arriving in March 2006. Scissorfight was named "best hard rock band" at the Boston Music Awards in 2003 and 2004.

After a nearly ten year hiatus, the band returned in 2016 with a new vocalist, drummer and EP entitled Chaos County.

Members

Current 
 Jay Fortin – guitar, multi-instrumentalist
 Paul Jarvis – bass
 Doug Aubin – vocals
 Rick Orcut – drums

Former 
 Ironlung – vocals, songwriting
 Kevin Strongbow – drums
 Joel Muzzey – drums
 Jared Schofield - drums

Discography 
 Guaranteed Kill (Wonderdrug Records, 1996)
 Balls Deep (Wonderdrug Records, 1998)
 New Hampshire (Tortuga Recordings, 1999)
 Piscataqua (EP) (Tortuga Recordings, 2000)
 Mantrapping for Sport and Profit (Tortuga Recordings, 2001)
 American Cloven Hoof Blues (UK only) (Tortuga Recordings/Eccentric Man Recordings, 2002)
 Potential New Agent For Unconventional Warfare (EP)(Tortuga Recordings, 2002)
 Deathchants, Breakdowns and Military Waltzes Vol. 2 (EP) (Tortuga Recordings, 2003)
 Instant Live: Middle East – Cambridge, MA 11/13/04 (2004)
 Victory Over Horseshit maxi-single (Tortuga Recordings, 2006)
 Jaggernaut (Tortuga Recordings, 2006)
 Greatest Hits (Tortuga Recordings 2012)
 Chaos County (EP) (Salt of the Earth Records, 2016)
 Doomus Abruptus, Vol. 1 (2019)

References

External links 

 Official website
 

Musical groups established in 1995
Musical quartets
Heavy metal musical groups from New Hampshire